Cache is an unincorporated community in Teton County, in the U.S. state of Idaho.

History
The community received its name from a cache of furs hidden near the site by French fur traders. A post office called Cache was established in 1904, and remained in operation until 1916. A variant name was "Dwight".

Cache's population was estimated at 100 in 1909.

References

Unincorporated communities in Teton County, Idaho
1904 establishments in Idaho